The Cowboy Cavalier is a 1928 American silent Western film directed by Richard Thorpe and starring Buddy Roosevelt, Olive Hasbrouck and Charles K. French.

Cast
 Buddy Roosevelt as Prince Charming - Deputy Sheriff 
 Olive Hasbrouck as Cinderella 'Cindy' 
 Charles K. French
 Fanny Midgley
 Robert D. Walker
 Bob Clark 
 William Ryno

References

External links
 

1928 films
1928 Western (genre) films
1920s English-language films
Films directed by Richard Thorpe
American black-and-white films
Pathé Exchange films
Silent American Western (genre) films
1920s American films